Gibraltar competed at the 2015 European Games, in Baku, Azerbaijan from 12 to 28 June 2015. Since Gibraltar are not members of the European Olympic Committees, Gibraltar participated for the Athletic Association of Small States of Europe.

Athletics

Individual

Overall

References

Nations at the 2015 European Games